313 is a year of the Julian calendar.

313 may also refer to:
 313 (album), a 2006 album by Phideaux Xavier
 Area code 313, a telephone code for Detroit in the North American Numbering Plan
 British Rail Class 313, a type of train
 Frame 313, part of the Zapruder film, showing the fatal shot to President Kennedy
 313, the name of Donald Duck's car in Italian comics